G'ova is a town belonging to the Chust District of the Namangan Region of the Republic of Uzbekistan. In 2009, it was given the status of a town.

References 

Populated places in Namangan Region